Avatar: The Last Airbender: The Video Game (Also known as Avatar: The Legend of Aang in Europe) is a video game based on the animated television series of the same name. It was released for the Game Boy Advance, Microsoft Windows, GameCube, Nintendo DS, PlayStation 2, PlayStation Portable, Wii, and Xbox. The game was a launch title for the Wii in North America. All versions feature an original story set between Book 1 and Book 2 of the series, except for the Microsoft Windows version, which features a different story, based on Book 1, and different gameplay.

A sequel, Avatar: The Last Airbender – The Burning Earth, was released in 2007.

Gameplay
The Avatar: The Last Airbender video game allows the player to control one of four characters – Aang, Katara, Haru, or Sokka – in a single-player adventure. Each character uses his or her own trademark weapon and fighting style, and is able to earn new special abilities through experience gained from defeating enemies. A variety of items can help the player with quests, or during battle (armor, chi, enchanted accessories, and healing potions). The game also enables the player to collect certain resources and bring them to artisans to make special items. Enemies include classic Firebenders, machines, and a variety of animals from the show, mainly the first book.

The Wii version varies with regard to the hot/cold minigame where the player's controller vibrates to help the player find hidden items. When the player finds the item, in most console versions, the player repeats a rhythm minigame until having a successful round. In the Wii version, there is a calligraphy minigame with the Wiimote instead. In combat, the Wii version requires that the player swings the Wiimote while pressing the button for a special move (in Aang's case, swinging his staff down to unleash a gust of air to knock enemies down), whereas the other versions only require pressing the button while holding the right shoulder button.

Plot

Characters
The main playable characters in the Avatar: The Last Airbender video game are Aang, Katara, Sokka, and Haru, the former three of which are main characters in the television series the video game is based on.

Aang is the fun-loving, 112-year-old (physically 12) protagonist of the video game, he was frozen in an iceberg for a century. He is the current incarnation of the Avatar, a human whose essence is forever bonded with that of the Avatar Spirit of Light and Peace. As the Avatar, Aang must master all four elements to bring peace to the world and restore the order between the Four Nations. Aiding him is the fourteen-year-old Katara, the sole remaining waterbender of the Southern Water Tribe, and her older brother Sokka, a fifteen-year-old warrior of the Southern Water Tribe. Haru is a young teenage Earthbender who helps the gang in their mission to save a missing friend. Many characters from the show appear on this; King Bumi, who appears in the fourth level.

Story
While training at the Northern Water Tribe, Avatar Aang and Katara hear reports of a waterbender, Hiryu, going missing, which they investigate. They arrive at the Water Tribe as a Fire Nation ship attacks, led by Prince Zuko. They are able to fend off the attackers, but Katara is captured during the battle. Aang and Sokka follow the ship, but are slowed by a firebending machine. 

They follow the ship to an Earth Kingdom port. They slip into the jail and release Katara, who informs them of another prisoner named Lian the Maker, who is being forced to make machines for the Fire Nation. When they arrive at Lian's cell, they find it empty, except for a map to an Earth Kingdom village.

They find the village under attack by machines. After fending off the machines, picking up Haru and being informed that one of his earthbending friends Yuan was kidnapped, they travel to the library of Omashu for clues to where the machines might originate from. The information from the library leads them to an uncharted island.

On the island, they find Lian, making more machines. She fears that Avatar Aang will not be able to master all four elements before Sozin's comet arrives. Aang refused her help, seeing as how the machines were disrupting villages. Lian then voiced her contempt for him as she sends a machine to fight them to flee to the Air temple, attempting to destroy the Avatar statues. They stop Lian, but Katara, Sokka, and Haru are all captured by another machine.

Aang pursues Lian and the machine to a fortress. After Aang rescues his friends, they find Prince Zuko, also captured by a machine. Upon rescuing him, Prince Zuko attacks the group. At the end of the resulting fight, the Fire Nation prince is knocked over a cliff and swept over a waterfall.

The four enter the fortress, where they find Lian, where she finished a machine being operated by the missing waterbender Hiryu, Haru's friend Yuan and a nameless firebender. Lian tries to attach Aang to the machine, but he battles it instead. During the fight, Katara is struck down, causing a furious Aang to enter the powerful Avatar State and destroy the machine once and for all, burying Lian under its rubble, killing her (though she survives in the portable versions of the game.)

As the four leave the fortress, Prince Zuko is seen crawling up on the shoreline, grumbling angrily, due to having failed to capture the Avatar.

Reception

Despite mixed critical reviews, THQ's Avatar: The Last Airbender performed well commercially, selling over one million units worldwide as of February 2007 and becoming THQ's top-selling Nickelodeon product of 2006. The game even went on to achieve Sony Computer Entertainment's "Greatest Hits" status for the PlayStation 2 on July 19, 2007.

References

External links
 

2006 video games
Video games with cel-shaded animation
THQ games
Tose (company) games
Wii games
Nintendo DS games
GameCube games
Game Boy Advance games
PlayStation 2 games
PlayStation Portable games
Video games developed in Australia
Video games developed in Japan
Xbox games
Windows games
Avatar: The Last Airbender (video game)
Halfbrick Studios games
Single-player video games